A subaqueous volcano is a volcano formed beneath freshwater and which never builds above lake level.

Subaqueous volcanoes can be compared to subaerial volcanoes which are formed and erupt on land surface, or under the air. The major differences of volcanic eruptions are due to the effects of pressure, heat capacity or conductivity of water, the presence of steam and water rheology. The thermal conductivity of water is about 20 times that of air and steam has a thermal conductivity nearly 50 times that of water.
Subaqueous volcanoes are most commonly formed in oceans, but can also form in lakes, rivers and subglacial lakes. In improving our understanding of subaqueous volcanoes, it is important to consider the differences between the characteristics of modern and ancient approaches to the study. Modern studies offer fresh and unaltered observances, can see and map surface features and the water depth is known in areas that allow observation. Ancient studies have had stratigraphic exposure to sections, are easier to work on, have more and better exposures and have an existing relationship to resources.

Some geologists would restrict the term subaqueous pyroclastic flow deposits to volcaniclastic units that show characteristics of emplacement in a hot state deposited underwater—however, this cannot always be done because of the subsequent process of alteration/diagenesis such as active hot springs and associated hydrothermal alteration. Deposits from pyroclastic flows that interact with water and are transformed into water-supported mass flows are called subaqueous pyroclastic debris flow deposits by some geologists. On the other hand, processes that are associated with eruption, transportation and deposition are notably different because of the presence of water. Such differences that the presence of water entails is the ability to vaporize when in contact with water, a high density and resulting confining pressure, high viscosity relative to air and differences in the thermal conductivities/heat capacities in the air relative to water.

Some understanding of subaqueous volcanoes can be inferred from knowledge of volcanic processes based on ancient successions. Subaqueous volcano deposits have been occurring in the south of Honshu, the largest island among Japan's four principal islands. The four subaqueous volcanic deposits have been documented and are located throughout Japan offer significant evidence to study.

Subaqueous volcanic deposits are associated with subaqueous sedimentary deposits and these deposits range from near shore, off-shore and abyssal mudstone deposits. Unfortunately, paleo-depth constraints for sedimentary strata are poor and subject to contradicting interpretations. However, the depth of emplacement can be conjectured with minor control of water depth. In determining the characteristics of pyroclastic flows in subaerial versus subaqueous deposits, it is commonly believed that water fluidized volcaniclastic flows become normally graded in terms of all components except for large, buoyant pumice blocks which settle to form large pumice layers. However, this phenomenon is usually seen as subaerial ignimbrite (pumice rich pyroclastic flows) deposits. Because of this, the characteristic is not considered clear evidence for the interpretation of the fluidizing agent (hot gas or water) and can therefore only be used in conjunction with other criteria.

Characteristics can be sorted to infer subaqueous eruption or emplacement of silicic pyroclastic deposits. Larger pumice blocks rise for a more extended period of time (minutes to hours) in comparison to smaller pumice fragments because of gases trapped within vesicles and the very fine ash fragments may become entrained into the rising plume of gas and heated water because of the low density and weight. Therefore, subaqueous silicic pyroclastic eruptions may be diminished in the course size fraction as well as the very fine ash size fraction based on the buoyancy of the material in the water medium. These characteristics may be important in determining the style of subaqueous eruption and emplacement mechanism. The characteristics of texture, such as grain morphology and grain size abundances can also provide knowledge on the process of controlling the eruption style or transport/flow properties, whether turbulent or laminar.

Seafloor exploration has discovered that more volcanic eruptions occur at the bottom of the sea than on land. However, the effects of ambient water and hydrostatic pressure on silicic volcanic eruptions in subaqueous settings are not entirely understood because deep marine eruptions are not directly observed and studied. Because of this, information of recent deep-water volcanic eruptions are still incomplete and limited.

The conclusions of the studies of subaqueous volcanoes in Japan determine that clear evidence for eruption and/or emplacement of pyroclastic flows continue to be determined from the examination of these deposits although inferential evidence such as grain morphology, sorting and grading can be used to identify and document ancient subaqueous volcanic deposits. 
The University of California, Santa Barbara will continue to conduct further research which may be able to provide further information on styles of subaqueous volcanic eruptions and/or flow characteristics of volcanic deposits.

References

Volcanoes
Volcanology